The Time Warp Spitfire Mk V is an American homebuilt aircraft that was designed and produced by Time Warp Aircraft of Lakeland, Florida, introduced in 1996 at Sun 'n Fun. When it was available the aircraft was supplied as a kit for amateur construction.

The aircraft is a 60% scale version of the Second World War British Supermarine Spitfire.

Design and development
The Spitfire Mk V features a cantilever low-wing, a single-seat enclosed cockpit under a bubble canopy, conventional landing gear and a single engine in tractor configuration.

The aircraft is made from wood and composites. The standard engine used is the  Geo Storm 1.6 liter liquid-cooled automotive conversion powerplant.

The manufacturer estimated the construction time from the supplied kit as 600 hours.

Operational history
By 1998 the company reported that one aircraft had been completed and was flying.

In March 2014 two examples were registered in the United States with the Federal Aviation Administration.

Specifications (Spitfire Mk V, estimated)

References

Spitfire
1990s United States sport aircraft
1990s United States ultralight aircraft
Single-engined tractor aircraft
Low-wing aircraft
Homebuilt aircraft
Supermarine Spitfire replicas